Ye Fashan or Yeh Fa-shan (631–720), also known as Perfect Man Ye, was a Taoist wonder-worker reportedly from the Tang dynasty.

According to hagiographic legend, he ascended to Heaven as an immortal "in broad daylight," 12 July, 720.

References

 T. H. Barrett (1996) - Taoism under the T'ang. London: Wellsweep Press.
 Alfredo Cadonna (1984) - Il Taoista di sua Maesta. Venezia: Cafoscarina.
 Russell Kirkland (1986) - Taoists of the High T'ang. Dissertation, Indiana University.
 Russell Kirkland (1992). "Tales of Thaumaturgy: T'ang Accounts of the Wonder-Worker Yeh Fa-shan." Monumenta Serica 40.
 Russell Kirkland (1993). "A World in Balance: Holistic Synthesis in the T'ai-p'ing kuang-chi." Journal of Sung-Yuan Studies 23.
 https://web.archive.org/web/20060316011016/http://www.arches.uga.edu/~kirkland/rk/pdf/pubs/ref/YEH98.pdf

631 births
720 deaths
People from Lishui
Tang dynasty Taoists
Deified Chinese people